The 1932–33 season was the 36th in the history of the Western Football League.

The Division One champions for the second time in their history were Exeter City Reserves. The winners of Division Two were the returning Swindon Town Reserves. There was again no promotion or relegation between the two divisions this season.

Division One
After Plymouth Argyle Reserves left the league, Division One was increased from eight to nine clubs, with two new clubs joining:

Bath City, Reserves re-joining after leaving the league in 1930.
Cardiff City Reserves, re-joining after leaving the league in 1921.

Division Two
Division Two remained at eighteen clubs after Coleford Athletic left and one new team joined:

Swindon Town Reserves, rejoining after leaving the league in 1927.

References

1932-33
4